Pseudopleurococcus is a genus of green algae in the order Ulvales. It was described by J.W. Snow in an 1899 volume of the Annals of Botany. The genus contains six recognized species.

References

Ulvophyceae genera
Ulvales